The Archaeological Museum of Volos, also known as Athanasakeion Archaeological Museum of Volos, is a museum located in Volos, Greece, that houses many exquisite finds from early 20th century and modern archaeological excavations in Thessaly. Exhibits on display include jewelry, household utensils and agricultural tools, originating from the Neolithic settlements of Dimini and Sesklo, as well as clay statuettes and a wide variety of items from the Geometric period, a time of great heroic events, such as the Argonaut Expedition and the Trojan War. There are also statues and uncommon jointed statuettes from the classical period, rare steles with relief work from the Hellenistic period wherein the colors are well-preserved, as well as reliefs from the early Christian and Byzantine periods. Other fascinating exhibits include tombs transported in their entirety from the archaeological sites where they were discovered, along with the human skeleton and the offerings placed around it. Just outside the museum there are some interesting reconstructions of the Neolithic houses at Dimini and Sesklo.

See also
List of museums in Greece

External links
Hellenic Ministry of Culture and Tourism
i-politismos (Greek only)
www.aroundpelion.com

Museums in Volos
Volos